Highland High School is a public high school near Sparta, Ohio.  It is the only high school in the Highland Local School District.  Their nickname is the Fighting Scots.

Ohio High School Athletic Association State Championships
 Boys Basketball – 1998

Notable alumni
Tim Belcher, Retired MLB Pitcher

Athletic Hall of Fame
On January 14, 2012 Highland High School inducted 14 former standout athletes and 1 former coach/contributor into the new Highland Local School District Athletic Hall of Fame. The hall is debuting in Highland’s 50th year of existence. The first inductees came from Highland High School along with former high schools at Sparta, Marengo and Chesterville which consolidated to form Highland in 1962.

 Vaughn Tobin, 1950, Chesterville, football and basketball
 Larry Hulse, 1954, Sparta, football and basketball
 Arnold “Buzz” Beatty, 1958, Marengo, basketball
 Jeff Jahn, 1977, Highland, basketball and baseball
 Wayne Warwick, 1979, Highland, basketball and baseball
 Tim Belcher, 1980, Highland, baseball and basketball
 Randy Linkous, 1990, Highland, baseball and basketball
 Chad Bukey, 1991, Highland, football and basketball
 Danny Bright, 1992, Highland, football, track and basketball
 Jason Terry, 1992, Highland, basketball
 Erin Kelly, 1994, Highland, cross country and track
 J.T. Hoyng, 1998, Highland, basketball
 Seth Hoyng, 2000, Highland, basketball and track
 Brad Hart, 2000, Highland, track, basketball and golf
 Jim Schoch, 1975–83, Highland, boys basketball coach

Notes and references

External links
 District Website
 Facebook Page
 Twitter

High schools in Morrow County, Ohio
Public high schools in Ohio